The Bishop of Rochester is the ordinary of the Church of England's Diocese of Rochester in the Province of Canterbury.

The town of Rochester has the bishop's seat, at the Cathedral Church of Christ and the Blessed Virgin Mary, which was founded as a cathedral in 604. During the late 17th and 18th centuries, it was customary for the Bishop of Rochester to also be appointed Dean of Westminster: the practice ended in 1802.  The diocese covers two London boroughs and West Kent, which includes Medway and Maidstone.

The bishop's residence is Bishopscourt in Rochester. His Latin episcopal signature is: "(firstname) Roffen", Roffensis being the genitive case of the Latin name of the see. The office was created in 604 at the founding of the diocese in the Kingdom of Kent under King Æthelberht.

Jonathan Gibbs has served as Bishop of Rochester since the confirmation of his election, on 24 May 2022.

History
The Diocese of Rochester was historically the oldest and smallest of all the suffragan sees of Canterbury. It was founded by St Augustine, who in 604 consecrated St Justus as its first bishop. (After two more Roman bishops, all subsequent bishops until 1066, beginning with Ithamar, were drawn from the Christianised inhabitants of Kent.) The diocesan territory consisted roughly of the western part of Kent, separated from the rest of the county by the River Medway, though the diocesan boundaries did not follow the river very closely. The restricted territory of the diocese meant that it needed only one archdeacon to supervise all 97 parishes.

From the foundation of the see, the Archbishop of Canterbury had enjoyed the privilege of nominating the bishop, but Archbishop Theobald transferred the right to the Benedictine monks of the cathedral, who exercised it for the first time in 1148.

List of bishops

Pre-Conquest

Conquest to Reformation

During the Reformation

Post-Reformation

Assistant bishops

Among those called Assistant Bishop of Rochester, or coadjutor bishop, were:
1889–1891 (res.): Alfred Barry, a Canon of Windsor and former Anglican Bishop of Sydney
19281939 (ret.): Lanchester King, Canon Residentiary of Rochester Cathedral and former Bishop of Madagascar
19411947 (res.) & 19501967 (d.): John Mann, Secretary of the CMS and former Bishop in Kyushu (Nippon Sei Ko Kai). John Charles Mann (6 February 188028 April 1967) was made deacon on Trinity Sunday 1903 (7 June), by Randall Davidson, Archbishop of Canterbury, at Canterbury Cathedral.
19651978 (ret.): Keith Russell, Vicar of Tunbridge Wells (until 1973), Rector of Hever with Markbeech thereafter, and former Bishop of Northern Uganda
19941997 (res.): David Evans, Gen. Sec. of SAMS and former Bishop in Peru

Notes

References

External links
Diocese of Rochester website
Rochester Cathedral website

 
Diocese of Rochester
Christianity in Kent
History of Kent
Rochester
Bishop of Rochester